The Yugoslavian Athletics Championships was an annual outdoor track and field competition organised by the Athletic Federation of Yugoslavia, which served as the Yugoslavian national championship for the sport. The competition lasted from 1920 to 2002. 

Starting as the championship for the Kingdom of Yugoslavia, it continued through to its successor, the Socialist Federal Republic of Yugoslavia, which was made up of six socialist republics – Bosnia and Herzegovina, Croatia, Macedonia, Montenegro, Serbia, and Slovenia. The gradual breakup of Yugoslavia saw Slovenia and Croatia leave, and consequently hold their own national championships from 1992 onwards, and Macedonia and Bosnia and Herzegovina broke away soon after. From 1992 the Yugoslavian Championships included athletes from Serbia and Montenegro only, and the country was renamed Serbia and Montenegro in 2003, bringing an end to the Yugoslavian era.

Men

100 metres

200 metres

400 metres

800 metres

1500 metres

3000 metres
1964: Drago Žuntar

5000 metres

10,000 metres

Half marathon
The 2000 edition of the Yugoslavian Half Marathon Championships was held on a short course, through the winners remained valid.

Marathon

100K run
1997: Zoran Janković
1998: Zoran Vasić
1999: Zoran Vasić
2001: Veljko Popović

3000 metres steeplechase

110 metres hurdles

400 metres hurdles

High jump

Pole vault

Long jump

Triple jump

Shot put

Discus throw

Hammer throw

Javelin throw

Decathlon

10,000 metres walk

20 kilometres walk

50 kilometres walk
1962: Munib Tabaković
2002: Aleksandar Raković

Cross country (long)

Cross country (short)

Partisans walk (26 km)

Women

100 metres

200 metres

400 metres

800 metres

1500 metres

3000 metres

5000 metres
The 2000 Yugoslavian Championship in women's 5000 metres had a refereeing error which caused the race to include an additional lap (400 metres).

10,000 metres

Half marathon
The 2000 Yugoslavian Half Marathon Championships was held over a short course, though the winner remained valid.

Marathon

100K run
2001: Stojanka Sokol

80 metres hurdles

100 metres hurdles

400 metres hurdles

High jump

Pole vault

Long jump

Triple jump

Shot put

Discus throw

Hammer throw

Javelin throw

Pentathlon

Heptathlon
The heptathlon replaced the pentathlon as the standard women's combined event at the Yugoslavian Championships in 1981.

5000 metres walk

10 kilometres walk
The 1991 event was held as a 10,000 m track walk and the 1994 event was a 5 km road walk.

Cross country

Partisans walk (12 km)

References

Champions 1960–2002
Yugoslavian Championships. GBR Athletics. Retrieved 2021-01-11.

Winners
 List
Yugoslavian Championships
Athletics